Josamycin is a macrolide antibiotic. It was isolated by Hamao Umezawa and his colleagues from strains of Streptomyces narbonensis var. josamyceticus var. nova in 1964.

It is currently sold in various countries.Brand examples are:

 Europe: Josalid, Josacine, Iosalide, Josamina
 Russia: Wilprafen (Вильпрафен)
 Japan: Josamy

Adverse effects

There has been a case report of edema of the feet.

References 

Macrolide antibiotics